Mordellistena concolor is a beetle in the genus Mordellistena of the family Mordellidae. It was described in 1902 by Lea.

References

concolor
Beetles described in 1902